Berfu Cengiz (born 18 October 1999) is a Turkish tennis player.

She has a career-high WTA rankings of 273 in singles, achieved on 6 February 2023, and 214 in doubles, set on 15 July 2019.

Cengiz won her first major ITF title ($80k) at the 2018 President's Cup in Astana.

ITF Circuit finals

Singles: 9 (5 titles, 4 runner-ups)

Doubles: 19 (8 titles, 11 runner-ups)

ITF Junior finals

Singles: 8 (5 titles, 3 runner–ups)

Doubles: 9 (3 titles, 6 runner–ups)

References

External links
 
 
 
 

1999 births
Living people
Turkish female tennis players
Sportspeople from Adana
21st-century Turkish women